Harrison is a town in Washington County, Georgia, United States. The population was 489 at the 2010 census.

History
The Georgia General Assembly incorporated the place as the Town of Harrison in 1886. The community was named after Green B. Harrison, an early settler.

Geography

Harrison is located at  (32.825655, -82.724504).

Demographics

As of the census of 2000, there were 509 people, 176 households, and 134 families residing in the town. The racial makeup of the town was 19.06% White, 79.37% African American, 0.79% Native American, 0.20% Asian, 0.20% from other races, and 0.39% from two or more races. Hispanic or Latino of any race were 0.20% of the population.

There were 176 households, out of which 36.4% had children under the age of 18 living with them, 44.3% were married couples living together, 30.7% had a female householder with no husband present, and 23.3% were non-families. 19.3% of all households were made up of individuals, and 7.4% had someone living alone who was 65 years of age or older.  The average household size was 2.89 and the average family size was 3.40.

In the town, the population was spread out, with 29.7% under the age of 18, 9.2% from 18 to 24, 27.3% from 25 to 44, 22.6% from 45 to 64, and 11.2% who were 65 years of age or older.  The median age was 35 years. For every 100 females, there were 98.8 males.  For every 100 females age 18 and over, there were 94.6 males.

The median income for a household in the town was $18,125, and the median income for a family was $23,571. Males had a median income of $21,250 versus $16,528 for females. The per capita income for the town was $11,429.  About 32.1% of families and 32.4% of the population were below the poverty line, including 40.9% of those under age 18 and 41.7% of those age 65 or over.

Notable people
Herbert Arlene (1914-1989), Pennsylvania State Senator from 1967 to 1980

See also

 Central Savannah River Area

References

Towns in Georgia (U.S. state)
Towns in Washington County, Georgia